St. John's Church is a church on Barrow Island, Barrow-in-Furness, Cumbria, England.

See also
 Listed buildings in Barrow-in-Furness
 List of places of worship in Barrow-in-Furness

References

St. John's
Church of England church buildings in Cumbria
Grade II listed churches in Cumbria